The Burn is a river on Dartmoor, Devon, England.

It is a tributary of the River Tavy.

References

See also
List of rivers of England.

Burn, River
2Burn